Jimmy Whyte was a Scottish footballer who played during the early 1950s. He started his career with junior side Dunipace before signing 'senior' with Dumbarton where he played for four seasons.

References

Scottish footballers
Dumbarton F.C. players
Scottish Football League players
Association football defenders
Year of birth missing